Labid may refer to:

Labīd, the Arabian poet
Labid, Iran (disambiguation)
Labid, a brand name for theophylline